The Cathedral of St. John the Evangelist in  Spokane, Washington, is the cathedral church of the Episcopal Diocese of Spokane. Three Spokane parishes, All Saints Cathedral, St. Peter's, and St. James, merged on October 20, 1929, to form the Cathedral of St. John the Evangelist. Construction began on the present cathedral four years previous in 1925 and was structurally completed in less than a generation under the supervision of founding architect Harold C. Whitehouse of the Spokane firm of Whitehouse & Price. It is located in the Rockwood neighborhood on Spokane's South Hill.

The cathedral is open Monday through Friday, 9am-4pm. Guided tours are often available on Fridays, 11am-2pm. On Sundays, guided tours usually are available immediately after the last morning worship service. The tour usually lasts around 45 minutes.

History
In 1924, not long after newly arrived bishop, Edward Makin Cross came to town is when the dream was hatched to put a cathedral on the South Hill to succeed the All Saints Cathedral downtown, and hiring church congregant, Harold C. Whitehouse to design it. A vacant plot of land where early prominent Spokanite, Francis H. Cook's house used to sit. Grand Boulevard, which passes diagonally in front of the cathedral as seen in the image above, begins its steep descent into Downtown Spokane directly in front of the cathedral. Its location at the crest of a hill that rises more than 300 feet above downtown makes the cathedral a visible landmark from much of downtown and areas to the north.

Touring Europe for design inspiration, Whitehouse eventually settled on using the English Gothic style with some French influences. The first stage of construction, the nave leading to the high altar was completed in late 1929, allowing for the first Eucharistic services to be held, ten days before the 1929 stock market crash which led to a halt in construction for almost two decades. Construction resumed in 1948, and the chancel, sanctuary, transepts, and Gothic tower were completed by 1954.

The first Dean of the cathedral was Richard Coombs, who relocated to Spokane in 1956 from Saint Paul's Episcopal Church in Salinas, California.

Features

The structure is built entirely of cut stone. It is a solid masonry construction featuring a sandstone exterior quarried near Tacoma and sandstone interior from Idaho with some Indiana limestone; the building contains no structural wood or steel.

Bishop Cross Tower, named to honor the cathedral's founder, houses a 49-bell carillon, one of only a handful in the Northwest, cast and installed by the English firm of John Taylor & Sons. Carillon concerts are played at Sunday services, at times of religious and civic festivals, and other times as announced. The carillon is best heard from outside on the Cathedral Close (nearby grounds).

Interior design
The carvings, and the figures in stained glass, include symbols of many faiths. Especially notable are carvings by Ole Sunde of Seattle and by Arcangelo Cascieri and Adio diBaccari of Boston, Mass. The stained glass windows, in classic Gothic style, are the work of the Charles J. Connick firm, and since its closure of the work of Willet Hauser Architectural Glass.

The Cathedral Organ, with 4,039 pipes, designed, built and installed in 1957 by the Aeolian-Skinner Company (Opus 1343) to interpret the whole range of organ literature and renovated in 2000 by Marceau & Associates, is so skillfully voiced that even the smallest pipes can be heard in every corner of the building. Recitals are scheduled throughout the year.

See also
List of the Episcopal cathedrals of the United States
List of cathedrals in the United States

References

External links

20th-century Episcopal church buildings
Bell towers in the United States
Buildings and structures in Spokane, Washington
Carillons
Christian organizations established in 1929
Churches completed in 1954
John the Evangelist, Spokane
Tourist attractions in Spokane, Washington
Sandstone churches in the United States
Churches in Spokane County, Washington